John Armstrong  (4 October 190530 December 1992) was an Anglican bishop. He was the fourth Bishop of Bermuda.

Early life and education
He was educated at Durham School, then an all-boys Private school in Durham, County Durham, England. He trained for ordination at St Francis College, a theological college in Nundah, Queensland, and completed a Licentiate in Theology (ThL) at the Australian College of Theology.

Ordained ministry
Armstrong was ordained as a deacon in 1932 (in the Diocese of Goulburn, Australia) and as a priest in 1933. He was a military chaplain in the Royal Navy for 28 years. He eventually rose to be Chaplain of the Fleet, serving from 1960 to 1963. He retired from the Royal Navy on 15 March 1963.

In 1963, Armstrong was appointed to the episcopate; he was the first Chaplain of the Fleet to proceed directly to the episcopate after leaving office. On 25 March 1963, he was consecrated a bishop by Michael Ramsey, Archbishop of Canterbury, during a service at Westminster Abbey.

References

1905 births
1992 deaths
People educated at Durham School
Chaplains of the Fleet
20th-century Anglican bishops in Bermuda
Anglican bishops of Bermuda
Companions of the Order of the Bath
Officers of the Order of the British Empire